York Library  (York Explore Library and Archive) is situated in Museum Street, York, England. It became a Grade II listed building in 1997.

York's first subscription library opened in 1794, but it was only in 1893 that the city's first public library was opened in Clifford Street by the then Duke and Duchess of York, in a building formerly occupied by the Institute of Popular Science and Literature. This was the period when free public libraries were supplanting subscription libraries, and the establishment of York's public library was the city's way of marking Queen Victoria's Diamond Jubilee. In 1917 the public library was merged with York Subscription Library.

The present library building on Museum Street was designed by Walter Brierley and opened in 1927. Since then, there have been a number of extensions to the building, most recently in 2014, when the library became home to the City Archives.

References

External links
Official website

Library buildings completed in 1927
Buildings and structures in York
Public libraries in North Yorkshire
Museum Street (York)
Grade II listed library buildings
Listed buildings in North Yorkshire